Andrew Scott Peterson (born June 11, 1972) is a retired American professional football player who played  four games with the National Football League's Carolina Panthers during its expansion year in 1995. Andrew played at Tackle for four games with the Panthers in 1995, making two starts during his brief career. Later he played for the Green Bay Packers. He is married to Margo Peterson of Whidbey Island, Washington, and has two daughters, Brooke Ellen Peterson born in 1997 and Brynn Hamlin born in 2000.

References
 http://www.nfl.com/players/profile?id=PET267626

1972 births
American football offensive tackles
Carolina Panthers players
Living people
Washington Huskies football players
Players of American football from Washington (state)
Sportspeople from Greenock
Scottish players of American football